Longphong is a census village in Longding circle of Tirap district in Arunachal Pradesh, India. Longphong is 78 km from Khonsa, the district headquarters. In the 2011 Census of India, it had a population of 1,174 people including 493 males and 681 females. Longphong is mainly populated by Wancho tribal people.

Longphong has a disturbance of poppy cultivation and militancy activities.

References 

Draft-Class Indian geography articles
Draft-Class geography articles